Florian Mader (born 14 September 1982) is an Austrian former professional association football player. He played as a midfielder.

References

1982 births
Living people
Austrian footballers
Association football midfielders
SC Rheindorf Altach players
SV Ried players
FK Austria Wien players
WSG Tirol players
Austrian Football Bundesliga players